Langlieria is a genus of prehistoric sarcopterygian (lobe-finned "fish"), from the end of the Devonian period (Famennian). It was discovered in Belgium and Pennsylvania.

References

Tristichopterids
Prehistoric lobe-finned fish genera
Devonian bony fish
Fossils of Belgium